This is the results breakdown of the local elections held in the Basque Country on 28 May 1995. The following tables show detailed results in the autonomous community's most populous municipalities, sorted alphabetically.

Overall

City control
The following table lists party control in the most populous municipalities, including provincial capitals (shown in bold). Gains for a party are displayed with the cell's background shaded in that party's colour.

Municipalities

Barakaldo
Population: 103,594

Basauri
Population: 50,020

Bilbao
Population: 371,876

Donostia-San Sebastián
Population: 177,929

Getxo
Population: 83,466

Irun
Population: 55,360

Portugalete
Population: 56,441

Rentería
Population: 41,418

Santurtzi
Population: 50,458

Vitoria-Gasteiz
Population: 214,148

Juntas Generales

References

Basque Country
1995